Henlow is a village and civil parish in the Central Bedfordshire district of the county of Bedfordshire, England, about  south-east of the county town of Bedford. The name Henlow is believed to derive from the old English henna hlaw, meaning in old English "hill of birds" or “hill frequented by birds”.

At the 2011 census the population of the village was 2,253, and 3,815 for the parish.

Village
Henlow is mentioned (with a degree of dispute recorded) in the Domesday Book. The entry reads: Haneslau(ue)/Hanslau(e): Herfast from Nigel d'Aubigny; Hugh from Walter of Flanders; Widder and Bernard from Azelina, Ralph Tailbois' wife (Hugh de Beauchamp claims from her, stating it was never in her dowry); Alric. 2 mills.

The parish includes RAF Henlow and that part of Henlow Camp situated east of the A600 road. While RAF Henlow is located near Henlow, it is nearer to the village of Stondon. The civilian settlement of Henlow Camp has grown up near to the RAF station.

There is a health farm in Henlow at Henlow Grange, part of the Champneys group.
The parish church, Grade I listed, and parts of which are from the 12th century, is dedicated to St Mary the Virgin.

References

External links 

Parish Council's comprehensive website
Church website
Raynsford VC Lower School's football club website

 
Villages in Bedfordshire
Civil parishes in Bedfordshire
Central Bedfordshire District